Oxybelis is a genus of colubrid snakes, endemic to the Americas, which are commonly known as vine snakes. Though similar in appearance to the Asian species of vine snakes of the genus Ahaetulla, they are not closely related, and are an example of convergent evolution.

Geographic range
Species of Oxybelis are found from the southwestern United States, through Central America, to the northern countries of South America.

Description
Body slender and laterally compressed, tail long. Head elongated and distinct from neck. Pupil of eye round.

Dorsal scales smooth or weakly keeled, with apical pits, and arranged in 15 or 17 rows at midbody. Ventrals rounded at sides, subcaudals paired (divided).

Maxillary teeth 20–25, subequal, except for the 3-5 most posterior, which are slightly enlarged and grooved on the outer surface. Anterior mandibular teeth strongly enlarged.

Species
There are 11 widely recognized species in the genus Oxybelis.

Oxybelis aeneus  - Mexican vine snake
Oxybelis brevirostris  - Cope's vine snake
Oxybelis fulgidus  - green vine snake
Oxybelis inkaterra  - Inkaterra vine snake
Oxybelis koehleri  - Köhler's vine snake
Oxybelis microphthalmus  - thrornscrub vine snake
Oxybelis potosiensis  - Gulf Coast vine snake
Oxybelis rutherfordi  - Rutherford's vine snake
Oxybelis transandinus 
Oxybelis vittatus 
Oxybelis wilsoni  - Roatan vine snake

Nota bene A binomial authority in parentheses indicates that the species was originally described in a genus other than Oxybelis.

Etymology
The specific name, wilsoni, is in honor of American herpetologist Larry David Wilson.

References

Further reading
Wagler J (1830). Natürliches System der AMPHIBIEN mit vorangehender Classification der SÄUGTHIERE und VÖGEL. Ein Beitrag zur vergleichenden Zoologie. Munich, Stuttgart and Tübingen: J.G. Cotta. vi + 354 pp + 1 Plate. (Oxybelis, new genus, p. 183).

External links

Colubrids
Snake genera
Taxa named by Johann Georg Wagler